Morphscape is the first solo album by video game music composer Frank Klepacki, released in 2002 and featuring ten songs.

Track listing
 Morphscape
 Blaster
 Freaks from Within
 Cybertek
 Mode One
 Gonna Rock Yo Body
 Cosmic Lounge
 Morphunk
 Defunkt
 Virus

All tracks were written and performed by Frank Klepacki.

References

Frank Klepacki albums